is a Japanese professional shogi player, ranked 9-dan. He is a former holder of the Ryūō, Meijin, Ōi, Kisei and Eiō titles.

Early life
Toyoshima was born in Ichinomiya, Aichi on April 30, 1990. He entered the Japan Shogi Association's apprentice school at the rank of 6-kyū under the guidance of shogi professional Kiyozumi Kiriyama in 1999.  He obtained professional status and the rank of 4-dan on April 1, 2007, after finishing tied for first with Kōta Kanai in the 40th 3-dan League (October 2006March 2007) with a record of 14 wins and 4 losses.

Shogi professional
Toyoshima's first appearance in a major title match came in 2010 when he defeated Yasumitsu Satō to win the 60th Ōshō league with a record of 5 wins and 1 loss,  Although Toyoshima lost his first game in league play, he proceeded to win his next five to earn the right to challenge defending Ōshō Toshiaki Kubo for his title. The match against Kubo was tied at one win apiece after two games, but Kubo won three out of the next four games to defend his title 42. Toyoshima was 20-years-old at the time which made him the youngest challenger in the tournament's history, breaking the record set by Hifumi Katō who was 22-years-old when he challenged for the title in 1961.

In July 2014, Toyoshima defeated Tadahisa Maruyama to win the right to challenge Yoshiharu Habu for the 62nd Ōza title. Although Toyoshima lost the first two games of his match against Habu, he won the next two to tie the match before losing the deciding Game 5.

In April 2015, Toyoshima defeated Meijin title holder Amahiko Satō to advance to the 86th Kisei title match, but lost to Habu 3 games to 1.

He reached the finals of the tournament once again in 2017, but lost to Takayuki Yamasaki.

Two days after his loss to Yamazaki, Toyoshima defeated Kōichi Fukaura on November 21, 2017, to win the 67th Ōshō league with a record of 5 wins and 1 loss and earn the right to challenge Kubo once again for the Ōshō title. Like their first meeting back in 2010, the players were tied at one win each after two games, but Kubo went on to win the match once again 4 games to 2.

On July 17, 2018, Toyoshima defeated Habu in Game 5 of the 89th Kisei match to capture his first major title. His victory meant that for the first time since 1987 (when there were only seven major titles) no player held more than one major title. The period of "no multiple titleholders", however, was ended by Toyoshima himself in September 2018 when he defeated Tatsuya Sugai 4 games to 3 to capture the 59th Ōi title and become a 2-crown title holder.

In March 2019, Toyoshima won the 77th Meijin Class A ranking league with a record of 8 wins and 1 loss to earn the right to challenge reigning Meijin Amahiko Satō for the 77th Meijin title. It was the first time Toyoshima earned the right to challenge for the Meijin title. In the AprilMay title match, Toyoshima defeated Satō 4 games to none. Toyoshima's victory made him a 3-crown title holder, and also made him the first shogi professional born in the :Heisei Era to win the Meijin title. Capturing the Meijin title also meant the Toyoshima met the criteria for promotion to the rank of 9-dan and he was awarded the rank by the JSA later the same day.

Toyoshima's first title defense came in JuneJuly 2019 when he faced challenger Akira Watanabe in the 90th Kisei title match. Toyoshima won the first game of the match, but Watanabe won the next three games to capture the title. With the loss, Toyoshima returned to being a 2-crown title holder.

Toyoshima defended his Ōi title against Kazuki Kimura in the 60th Ōi title match (July 7September 26, 2019). Toyoshima won the first two games, but proceeded to lose the next two. Toyoshima won Game 5 and needed just one more win to defend his title, but  Kimura won the last two games to win the match 4 games to 3.

In September 2019, Toyoshima and Kimura met again the 32nd Ryūō Challenger Playoff Match to earn the right to challenge defending Ryūō Akihito Hirose for the 32nd Ryūō title. Toyoshima won the match 2 games to 1 and became a challenger for the Ryūō title for the first time. In the OctoberDecember title match against Hirose, Toyoshima won the first three games and ended up winning the match 4 games to 1. The victory not only returned Toyoshima to 2-crown title holder status and gave him his first Ryūō title, but it also made him only the fourth professional shogi player to hold the Ryūō and Meijin titles at the same time.

Toyoshima defeated Watanabe in the championship game of the 27th  on September 24, 2019, to win the tournament for the first time.

In JuneAugust 2020, Toyoshima was unable to defend his Meijin title, losing the 78th Meijin title match to Watanabe 4 games to 2.

Toyoshima captured the 5th Eiō title on September 21, 2020, when he defeated the defending Eiō title holder Takuya Nagase 4 games to 3. The two players actually needed nine games to determine the best-of-seven match because two of the games ended in impasse.

Toyoshima and Nagase faced each other again in the finals of the 41st Nihon Series JT Professional Tournament in November 2020; Toyoshima defeated Nagase to win the tournament for the second time.

Toyoshima successfully defended his Ryūō title in December 2020 by winning the 33rd Ryūō title match (OctoberDecember 2020) against  4 games to 1.

In 2021, Toyoshima faced Sōta Fujii in three major title matches and in the final of one non-major title tournament. Toyoshima challenged Fujii for the latter's Ōi title in JuneAugust 2021, but lost the 62nd Ōi title match 4 games to 1. At roughly the same time, Toyoshima and Fujii also met in the 6th Eiō title match (JulySeptember 2021), with the challenger Fujii winning 3 games to 2. The pair met again in the  when Fujii challenged Toyoshima for the Ryūō title in 34th Ryūō title match held in OctoberNovember 2021. Fujii won the match 4 games to none to drop Toyoshima from the ranks of current major title holders. Toyoshima and Fujii met about a week after the conclusion of the 34th Ryūō in the championship game of the 42nd Nihon Series JT Professional Tournament: Toyoshima defeated Fujii to repeat as champion and win the tournament for the third time overall.

Toyoshima defeated Ayumu Matsuo in March 2022 to win the 71st NHK Cup. It was the first time Toyoshima won the tournament. In JuneSeptember 2022, Toyoshima challenged  once again for the Ōi title, but lost the 63rd Ōi title match 4 games to 1.

Promotion history
Toyoshima's promotion history is as follows:
 6-kyū: September 1999
 4-dan: April 1, 2007
 5-dan: May 8, 2009
 6-dan: November 29, 2010
 7-dan: April 19, 2012
 8-dan: March 9, 2017
 9-dan: May 17, 2019

Titles and other championships
Toyoshima has appeared in a major title match eighteen times, and has won six major titles. In addition to major titles, he has won five other shogi championship.

Major titles

Other championships

Awards and honors
Toyoshima has received a number awards given out annually by the JSA for performance in official games.

Annual Shogi Awards
37th Annual Shogi Awards (April 2009March 2010): Best Winning Percentage, Most Games Won
38th Annual Shogi Awards (April 2010March 2011): Best New Player
39th Annual Shogi Awards (April 2011March 2012): Most Games Won
42nd Annual Shogi Awards (April 2014March 2015): Most Games Played, Game of the Year
44th Annual Shogi Awards (April 2016March 2017): Most Consecutive Games Won
46th Annual Shogi Awards (April 2018March 2019): Player of the Year
 47th Annual Shogi Awards (April 2019March 2020): Excellent Player, Game of the Year
48th Annual Shogi Awards (April 2020March 2021): Fighting-spirit
49th Annual Shogi Awards (April 2021March 2022): Game of the Year

Other awards
 2019: Osaka Culture Prize

Year-end prize money and game fee ranking
Toyoshima has finished in the "Top 10" of the JSA's  eight times since turning professional: fifth in 2014 with JPY 21,600,000 in earnings; eighth in 2015 with JPY 24,590,000 in earnings; seventh in 2016 with JPY 24,920,000 in earnings; fourth in 2018 with JPY 47,220,000 in earnings; first in 2019 with JPY 71,570,000 in earnings; first in 2020 with JPY 106,450,000 in earnings; second in 2021 with JPY 81,450,000 in earnings; and 3rd in 2022 with JPY 50,710,000 in earnings.

References

External links
 ShogiHub: Professional Player Info · Toyoshima, Masayuki

Japanese shogi players
Living people
Professional shogi players
Kansai University alumni
Professional shogi players from Aichi Prefecture
1990 births
Kisei (shogi)
Ōi (shogi)
Meijin (shogi)
Ryūō
Eiō
People from Ichinomiya, Aichi
Ginga